The Oxford City Athletic Club is an athletics club in Oxford, England. The club is at the Horspath Sports Ground by the BMW Mini factory. It is affiliated with the Oxfordshire Athletics Association, the South of England Athletic Association (SEAA), and UK Athletics. The club is accredited by England Athletics.

Notable members 
The following are or have been members of the club:

 Nathan Douglas, triple jumper (5 times British champion & double European silver medallist)
 Hannah England, middle-distance runner (World Championship silver medallist)
 Gemma Bridge, British racewalking champion

References

External links 
 Oxford City Athletic Club website

Organisations based in Oxford
Sport in Oxford
Athletics clubs in England